Santos Sambajon (born September 10, 1960) is a Filipino professional pool player. His nicknames are "The Little Giant" and "The Saint." Originally from the Philippines, he now resides in the United States.

Professional career

In 2004, Sambajon was first seen on television playing at the finals of the BCA Open Nine-ball Championship. While he did not win that event, Sambajon dominated the World Summit of Pool, a tournament featured on ESPN several months later, by defeating Mike Davis in the finals.

In 2005, he won the Skins Billiards Championship, another tournament televised on ESPN, by besting Danny Basavich in sudden death. This was Sambajon's greatest win, earning him $73,500, the most he has earned from a single event.

He nearly had the chance to compete in the WPA World Nine-ball Championship in 2004 but could not, due to passport problems. He made his debut at that tournament in 2006.

He served as Efren Reyes's corner man (players who reached the finals of an IPT event get to have someone who would instruct or give them advice during the match) at the final of the 2006 IPT World Open Eight-ball Championship.

Titles
2007 Blaze Tour Stop
2007 Blaze 9-Ball Tour Stop
2005 Skins Billiards Championship
2005 Joss NE 9-Ball Tour Stop
2004 World Summit of Pool
2004 Joss NE 9-Ball Tour Stop
2004 Joss NE 9-Ball Tour Stop
2004 Jay Swanson Memorial
2003 New England 9-Ball Championship
2003 Joss NE 9-Ball Tour Stop 1
2003 Hard Times 4th Annual Summer Jamboree One Pocket 
2003 Joss NE 9-Ball Tour Stop #25
2003 Joss NE 9-Ball Tour Stop #24
2003 Joss NE 9-Ball Tour Stop #20
2003 Joss Northeast Tour Stop 7
2003 Joss Northeast Tour Stop 5
2002 Joss Northeast Tour Stop 16
2002 Joss Northeast Tour Stop 14
2002 Joss Northeast Tour Stop 13
2000 Joss Northeast Tour Stop 13
2000 California Billiard Club Open One Pocket
2000 Planet-Pool.com Tour Stop 3 Men's Division
2000 Joss Northeast Tour Stop 12
2000 Joss Northeast Tour Stop 8

References

External links
 Last rack video footage of the Skins Billiard Championship

Living people
Filipino pool players
1960 births
Place of birth missing (living people)